The chapel of Notre-Dame des Cyclistes is situated in the commune of Labastide-d'Armagnac in Les Landes département in Aquitaine, France.

The chapel is all that remains of a 12th-century fortress of the Knights Templar. The Château de Géou was razed by the Black Prince in 1355.

It was listed as a monument historique by the French Ministry of Culture on 27 February 1996.

History
On 22 August 1958, Father Joseph Massie, pastor of Créon-d'Armagnac, Mauvezin-d'Armagnac and Lagrange, was inspired by the chapel of Madonna del Ghisallo in Italy to make a similar chapel for cyclists. On 18 May 1959, Pope John XXIII agreed to make the old chapel a National Sanctuary of Cycling and Cyclists under the protection of the Virgin: Our Lady of cyclists (Notre-Dame des cyclistes).

The Tour de France has passed the chapel five times: in 1984, 1989, 1995, 2000 and 2017. There was also a departure from Labastide-d'Armagnac on July 9, 1989.

Museum of cycling

The chapel and museum is a focal point for amateur cyclists and tourists. From 1958, it was converted into a Museum of Cycling in aid of French racing and touring cyclists. Numerous champions have donated  their shirts, including André Darrigade, Jacques Anquetil, Louison Bobet, Tom Simpson, Roger Lapébie, Jean Stablinski, Bernard Hinault, Raymond Poulidor, Eddy Merckx and Luis Ocaña

The chapel includes a stained glass window designed and created by Henri Anglade, a former rider of the Tour de France, to represent cycling. It was reportedly intended to celebrate a thaw in the intense rivalry between Fausto Coppi and Gino Bartali, as they shared a bottle (bidon) on the Col d'Izoard during the 1952 Tour de France.

The bicycle used in the French film Les Cracks, directed by Alex Joffé in 1968, is on display at the museum.

Other chapels of cycling
  Madonna del Ghisallo, situated in Magreglio near Lake Como and was dedicated to Italian cycling in 1948 by Pope Pius XII.
 Nuestra Señora de Dorleta, situated in Leintz-Gatzaga (Basque; in Spanish Salinas de Léniz) in the province of Guipuzcoa.

References

External links
 

Churches in Landes (department)
Chapels in France
Cycling in France
Museums in Landes (department)
Cycling museums and halls of fame